Germán Torres (born May 28, 1957) is a Mexican former world boxing champion. His nickname was Ozeki. Torres was born in Celaya, Guanajuato.

Pro career 
Torres turned pro in 1975 at the age of fifteen, and won the vacant WBC light flyweight title in his fifth attempt, with a decision win over Soon-Jung Kang in 1988. He had lost decisions to Hilario Zapata and Jung-Koo Chang (three times). He lost the title in his first defense to Yul-Woo Lee in 1989 by TKO.

See also
List of light-flyweight boxing champions
List of Mexican boxing world champions

References

External links 
 

1957 births
Living people
Boxers from Guanajuato
People from Celaya
Light-flyweight boxers
World light-flyweight boxing champions
World Boxing Council champions
Mexican male boxers